Quadcross of Nations (QXoN), officially known as Quadcross of European Nations (QXoEN) is a single ATV event organized by FIM at the end of the year. The event includes teams of three riders representing their nations. There are three motos with two riders of each nation competing per moto. The location of the event changes from year to year.

History
The event started in 2009 with only European nations. In 2017 USA, Argentina and Australia, as the first nations outside Europe, participated in the event. In 2018, Canada joined and participated for their first time.

The scoring for the event works on the position system, i.e. first place is awarded one point, second place two, etc. Each rider races twice. The worst score of three races is dropped, and the lowest combined score wins.

Event winners

Event winners by team

Event podium finishers by team

References 

Motocross
Motorcycle races
Annual sporting events
World motorcycle racing series
Fédération Internationale de Motocyclisme